Working: Researching, Interviewing, Writing is a memoir by biographer Robert Caro about the craft of biographical research and writing.

Further reading

External links 
 
 Q&A interview with Caro on Working, March 24, 2019, C-SPAN
 Interview by Conan O'Brien with Caro on Working, April 16, 2019, C-SPAN

2019 non-fiction books
American memoirs
English-language books
Alfred A. Knopf books
Books about writing
The Bodley Head books